The Tripartitum or Opus Tripartitum (in full, "Customary Law of the Renowned Kingdom of Hungary in Three Parts") is a manual of Hungarian customary law completed in 1514 by István Werbőczy and first published at Vienna in 1517. Although it never received official approval, it was highly influential and went through fifty editions in three hundred years. The Tripartitum did not include the so-called written law (parliamentary laws, royal decrees and statutes of the assemblies of the counties and the statutes of the free royal cities), which were always recorded in the law books after the decisions.

Werbőczy was a petty nobleman and the Tripatitum "enshrines the ideals of a typical contemporary member of his class". It asserts the privileges of the nobility against the crown, the equality of all nobles as against the claims of superiority of the upper nobility (magnates) and the onerous duties of serfs. A peasant revolt led by György Dózsa had been suppressed earlier in 1514, which influenced Werbőczy harsh treatment of serfs. The Tripartitum played a large role in perpetuating Hungary's feudal system.

References

External links
Some important chapters from the Tripartitum in original Latin and translated English
Tripartitum on Google Books

Legal history of Hungary
16th century in Hungary
16th century in Croatia
1514 in Europe
1517 in Europe
16th century in law